Basedowia may refer to:
 Basedowia (plant), a flowering plant genus in the family Asteraceae
 Basedowia (beetle), a beetle genus in the family Curculionidae